Reginald Hamilton may refer to:
 Reg Hamilton (1914–1991), Canadian ice hockey player
 Reggie Hamilton (born 1989), American basketball player